Wilmot E. Fleming (December 20, 1916 – May 20, 1978) was an American politician from Pennsylvania who served as a Republican member of the Pennsylvania House of Representatives for the Montgomery County district from 1963 to 1964 and the Pennsylvania State Senate for the 12th district from 1964 to 1978.

Early life and education
Fleming was born in Philadelphia, Pennsylvania to Wilmot and Lillie F. (Bains) Fleming.  He graduated from Cheltenham Township High School and the Wharton School at the University of Pennsylvania.

Business career
He worked in manufacturing as a partner in the Wilmot Fleming Engineering Company.

Political career
He served as a member of the Pennsylvania House of Representatives for Montgomery County from 1963 to 1964.  He was elected to the Pennsylvania State Senate for the 12th district in a special election and served from November 16, 1964 until his death in office due to a heart attack on May 20, 1978.

He is interred at Laurel Hill Cemetery in Philadelphia, Pennsylvania.

References

1916 births
1978 deaths
20th-century American politicians
Burials at Laurel Hill Cemetery (Philadelphia)
Republican Party members of the Pennsylvania House of Representatives
Republican Party Pennsylvania state senators
People from Cheltenham, Pennsylvania
Politicians from Philadelphia
University of Pennsylvania alumni